Adwa (also spelled Aduwa) is a town and separate woreda in Tigray Region, Ethiopia. Adwa is surrounded by Adwa woreda.

Adwa is home to several notable churches: Adwa Gebri'el Bet (built by Dejazmach Wolde Gebriel), Adwa Maryam Bet (built by Ras Anda Haymanot), Adwa Medhane `Alem Bete (built by Ras Sabagadis), Adwa Queen of Sheba secondary school, and Adwa Selasse Bet. Near Adwa is Abba Garima Monastery, founded in the sixth century by one of the Nine Saints and known for its tenth century gospels. Also nearby is the village of Fremona, which had been the base of the 16th century Jesuits sent to convert Ethiopia to Catholicism.

History

Origins
According to Richard Pankhurst, Adwa derives its name from Adi Awa (or Wa), "village of the Awa". The Awa are a tribe that was mentioned in the anonymous Monumentum Adulitanum that once stood at Adulis. Francisco Alvares records that the Portuguese diplomatic mission passed Adwa, which he called "Houses of St. Michael," in August 1520.
Despite this claim of antiquity, Adwa only acquired major importance following the establishment of a permanent capital at Gondar. As the traveler James Bruce noted, Adwa was situated on a piece of "flat ground through which every body must go in their way from Gondar to the Red Sea". The person who controlled this plain could levy profitable tolls on the caravans which passed through.

By 1700, it had become the residence for the governor of Tigray province and grew to overshadow Debarwa, the traditional seat of the Bahr negus, as the most important town in northern Ethiopia. Its market was important enough to need a Nagadras. The earliest known person to hold this office was the Greek immigrant Janni of Adwa, a brother of Petros, chamberlain to Emperor Iyoas I. Adwa was home to a small colony of Greek merchants into the 19th century.

19th century
Because of its location on this major trade route, it is mentioned in the memoirs of numerous 19th-century Europeans visiting Ethiopia. These include Arnaud and Antoine d'Abbadie, Henry Salt, Samuel Gobat, Mansfield Parkyns and Théophile Lefebvre. After the defeat and death of Ras Sabagadis in the Battle of Debre Abbay, its inhabitants fled Adwa for safety. The town was briefly held by Emperor Tewodros II in January 1860, who had marched from the south in response to the rebellion of Agew Neguse, who had burned then fled the town.

Giacomo Naretti passed through Adwa in March 1879, after it had been devastated by a typhus epidemic. It had been reduced to a shadow of itself, having about 200 inhabitants.

20th century

Its geographical importance has also led to Adwa's greatest importance as the site of the final battle of the First Italo-Ethiopian War, where the Ethiopian Emperor fought to defend Ethiopia's independence against Italy in 1896. Menelik led the Ethiopian Army to a decisive victory against the Italians, which ensured an independent Ethiopia until the Italians invaded again in 1935 (Second Italo-Ethiopian War). A large tree at the edge of the town was shown to visitors in the following years as the place where Emperor Menelik passed judgement on about 800 Eritrean askaris captured in the battle. Eritrean Battalions were part of the Italian colonial army, but the drumhead court-martial that passed judgment on them did not recognise this, and condemned the prisoners to having their right hand and left foot cut off.

Writing in the 1890s, Augustus B. Wylde described the Adwa market, held on Saturdays, as a large one with cattle of all sorts available for purchase. The Asmara-Addis Ababa telegraph line, constructed by the Italians in 1902-1904, passed through Adwa and had an office there. By 1905 it was considered the third-largest town in Tigray. Telephone service reached Adwa by
1935, but no phone numbers are listed for the town in 1954.

On 6 October 1935 Italian forces entered Adwa, after two days of bombardment had shocked Ras Seyoum Mengesha into a hasty retreat, abandoning large stocks of food and other supplies.
The Italian Gavinana Division brought with them a stone monument in honor of the Italian soldiers who had fallen in 1896. This monument was erected immediately after their arrival, and inaugurated on 15 October in the presence of General Emilio De Bono. The town had passed from Italian hands before 12 June 1941, when the newly arrived 34th Indian State Force Brigade set up a post office there.

During the Woyane rebellion, 6000 of the territorial troops retreated to Adwa on 22 September 1943. By 1958 Adwa was one of 27 places in Ethiopia ranked as First Class Township. During the 1960s the town was not only an educational center but also an early focus for nationalist dissent, indicated by the fact that all three of the leaders of the Tigrayan People's Liberation Front (TPLF) over the 22-year period from 1975 to 1997, Aregawi Berhe, Sebhat Nega, and Meles Zenawi, all came from Adwa and attended the town's government school.

Adwa was a frequent target of attacks by the TPLF during the Ethiopian Civil War: in 1978 the TPLF attacked Adwa; in 1979 it unsuccessfully tried to rob the bank. The town permanently passed into TPLF control in March 1988. Adwa and its environs are the native district of many of the core leaders of the TPLF which lead Ethiopia today, and the district was represented in Parliament by the former Prime Minister Meles Zenawi himself.

Air raids during the civil war of the 1980s
During the Ethiopian Civil War, Adwa was bombed frequently from the air by the Ethiopian National Defence Forces:
 On 26 March 1989: casualties not known
 On 27 March 1989, a night attack: casualties not known
 On 5 November 1989: no fatalities reported
 On 23 June 1990, on Adi Abun: one person wounded

Demographics 
Based on the 2007 national census conducted by the Central Statistical Agency of Ethiopia (CSA), this town has a total population of 40,500, of whom 18,307 are men and 22,193 women. The majority of the inhabitants said they practiced Ethiopian Orthodox Christianity, with 90.27% reporting that as their religion, while 9.01% of the population were Muslim.
The 1994 census reported it had a total population of 24,519 of whom 11,062 were males and 13,457 were females.

Sports
Almeda Textile Football Club (ALTEX) was promoted to the Ethiopian National Football League after winning the Ethiopian football club championships held in Mekelle. ALTEX beat Meta Beer Football Club 2-1 in the final. ALTEX is the first club from Adwa town to represent the town in Ethiopian association football history.

Films
Adwa - An African Victory (1999). Directed by Haile Gerima

Notable people
Kinfe Abraham, academic and politician.
 Gebrehiwot Baykedagn, economist, statesman and political theorist, one of the prominent reformist intellectuals of the early 20th century Ethiopia.
Tewolde Berhan Gebre Egziabher, scientist and environmentalist.
Sebhat Guèbrè-Egziabhér, writer.
Abune Paulos, Patriarch of the Ethiopian Orthodox Tewahedo Church.
Abay Tsehaye, politician.
Fisseha Desta, Vice President
Abuna Yesehaq, leader of the Ethiopian Orthodox Tewahedo Church in the Western hemisphere.
Meles Zenawi, Prime Minister.
Arkebe Oqubay, Economist

See also

Battle of Adwa

References

Populated places in the Tigray Region
Cities and towns in Ethiopia
Ethiopia